Bardeh Zard is a village in Behi-e Feyzolah Beygi Rural District, in the Central District of Bukan County, West Azerbaijan Province, Iran. At the 2006 census, its population was 984, in 202 families.

References 

Populated places in Bukan County